This is a list of the 6 members of the European Parliament for Luxembourg in the 1999 to 2004 session.

List

Party representation

Notes

Luxembourg
List
1999

lb:Lëscht vun de lëtzebuergeschen Europadeputéierten#5. Legislaturperiod (1999-2004)